The Andhra Pradesh Capital Region Development Authority (abbreviated as APCRDA), Amaravati, ACT No. 27 of 2020. It was notified on 31 July 2020 by the Government of Andhra Pradesh as per The Andhra Pradesh Capital Region Development Authority Repeal Act, 2020, it replaced the Andhra Pradesh Capital Region Development Authority Act, 2014. The authority has a jurisdictional area of 8,352.69 km2 (3,224.99 sq mi), covering the districts of Guntur, NTR, Krishna, Palnadu, and Bapatla.

The Andhra Pradesh Capital Region Development Authority (hereinafter referred
to as APCRDA) as constituted under Section 4 of the Principal Act shall cease to
exist.

History 
Post bifurcation of Andhra Pradesh, it was defunct and was renamed as APCRDA. APCRDA is Defunct now and Amaravati Metropolitan Development Authority is formed. The head office of the authority is located at Lenin Centre in Vijayawada. It also has three sub-registrar offices at Thullur, Ananthavaram, and Mandadam. The present commissioner of the authority is P. Lakshmi Narasimham.

AMRDA 
The areas within the jurisdiction of APCRDA under the Principal Act, viz., the A.P.
Capital Region shall be deemed to be constituted as Amaravati Metropolitan Region
Development Area under the Andhra Pradesh Metropolitan Region and Urban
Development Authorities Act, 2016 notwithstanding the procedure contained in Section
3 of the said Act. The Metropolitan Region and Urban Development Authorities
constituted under Section 4 of the said Act to be named as the Amaravati Metropolitan
Region Development Authority (hereinafter referred to as the AMRDA) shall be notified
by the Government on the cessation of APCRDA.

See also 
Visakhapatnam Metropolitan Region Development Authority
List of neighbourhoods in Amaravati

References

External links 
 APCRDA Facts and Figures

State agencies of Andhra Pradesh
Urban development authorities of Andhra Pradesh
Amaravati
2020 establishments in Andhra Pradesh
Organisations based in Vijayawada